Cheshmeh-ye Sar (also Romanized as Cheshmeh-ye Sār) is a village in Pol-e Doab Rural District, Zalian District, Shazand County, Markazi Province, Iran. At the 2006 census, its population was 294, in 71 families.

References 

Populated places in Shazand County